is a registered museum in Kushiro, Hokkaidō, Japan. Upon completion of the new, dedicated museum building in 1983, the museum was renamed the Kushiro City Museum. The displays centre around the geology, flora and fauna, and history of the area, with exhibits including the fossil jaw from which the Kushiro tapir [ja] (Plesiocolopirus kushiroensis)  was described as well as Jōmon, Satsumon, and Ainu materials.

See also
 List of Historic Sites of Japan (Hokkaidō)
 Hokkaido Museum
 Moshiriya Chashi

References

External links
  Kushiro City Museum
  Kushiro City Museum

Museums in Hokkaido
Kushiro, Hokkaido
Museums established in 1936
1936 establishments in Japan